White Amazons (Italian: Amazzoni bianche) is a 1936 Italian "white-telephones" comedy film directed by Gennaro Righelli and starring Paola Barbara, Luisa Ferida and Doris Duranti. Screwball in style, it is part of the tradition of schoolgirl comedies of the Fascist era. It is set in a winter sports resort, where an all-female race with a prize of two hundred thousand lira for the winner provokes rivalry and confusions.

Cast

References

Bibliography 
 Jacqueline Beth Reich. Fascism, Film, and Female Subjectivity: The Case of Italian Cinema 1936-1943. University of California, Berkeley, 1994.

External links 
 

1936 films
Italian comedy films
1936 comedy films
1930s Italian-language films
Films directed by Gennaro Righelli
Italian black-and-white films
1930s Italian films